Miss Brazil World 2014 was the 25th edition of the Miss Brazil World pageant and the 9th under MMB Productions & Events. The contest took place on August 9, 2014. Each state, the Federal District and various Insular Islands competed for the title. Sancler Frantz of Ilha dos Lobos crowned her successor, Julia Gama of Rio Grande do Sul at the end. Gama represented Brazil at Miss World 2014. The contest was held at the Costão do Santinho Resort in Florianópolis, Santa Catarina, Brazil.

Results

Regional Queens of Beauty

Special Awards

Challenge Events

Beach Beauty

Beauty with a Purpose

Miss Multimedia

Sports

Miss Talent

Top Model

Delegates
The delegates for Miss Brazil World 2014 were:

States

 - Tainá Menezes
 - Camila Leão
 - Daiane Uchôa
 - Hanna Weiser
 - Jéssica Alli
 - Natálya Braga
 - Nicole Moreira
 - Nathália Deon
 - Luciana Novais
 - Nicolle Casagrande
 - Jéssica Fiorenza
 - Camila Nantes
 - Eduarda D'Ávila
 - Kíssia Oliveira
 - Camilla Gadelha
 - Érica Henrique
 - Andresa Alves
 - Gabrielle Vilela
 - Vanessa Medeiros
 - Julia Gama
 - Micheli Eggert
 - Carina Brendler
 - Elisa Freitas
 - Victória Ceotto
 - Rafaela Machado
 - Fernanda Caixeta

Insular Regions

 Anavilhanas Islands - Domênica Nepomuceno
 Florianópolis Islands - Gabriela Gerber
 Ilhabela - Greicy Kelly Nobre
 Ilha da Pintada - Vitória Strada
 Ilhas de Búzios - Isabel Correa
 Ilha de Maracá - Claudine Kathleen
 Ilha de Santana - Andréia Cordovil
 Ilhas do Guaíba - Marceli Viana
 Ilha do Mel - Joana Marafon
 Ilha dos Lobos - Vitória Bisognin
 Ilha dos Marinheiros -  Juliana Bohm
 Marajó - Bianca Cardoso
 Porto Belo - Priscielle Carraro
 São Francisco do Sul - Emanuele Pamplona

Did not compete

References

External links
 Official site (in Portuguese)

2014
2014 in Brazil
2014 beauty pageants